Frank Carney was an American football player and coach.  He served as the fourth head football coach at Boston College, coaching one season in 1896 and compiling a record of 5–2.  His five wins included two victories over Holy Cross and a season finale defeat of cross-town rival Boston University.  Carney played for Boston College in 1894 and 1895.  His hometown was Cambridgeport, Massachusetts.

Head coaching record

References

Year of birth missing
Year of death missing
Place of birth missing
Place of death missing
19th-century players of American football
Boston College Eagles football coaches
Boston College Eagles football players
Sportspeople from Cambridge, Massachusetts
Players of American football from Massachusetts